Ian O'Leary is an American-Irish basketball player  who last played for Montakit Fuenlabrada.

Professional career
O'Leary started his professional career with Ciudad de Vigo Básquet, finishing in the last position of the 2009–10 LEB Oro season. One year later, he signed for Oviedo CB of the LEB Plata. He performed 16.0 points and 9.5 rebounds per game and was claimed as MVP of the 2010–11 season.

O'Leary came back to LEB Oro in 2011 after signing a one-year deal with Palencia Baloncesto before making his debut in Liga ACB with Blancos de Rueda Valladolid. He only stayed the 2012–13 season with the Castilian team before signing with Herbalife Gran Canaria.

In April 2015, he played the 2015 Eurocup Finals with the Canarian team.

The Basketball Tournament
Ian O'Leary played for Team Gael Force in the 2018 edition of The Basketball Tournament. In three games, he had 14.3 points per game and a team-high 10.7 rebounds per game on 59 percent shooting. Team Gael Force made it to the Super 16 before falling to eventual tournament runner-up Eberlein Drive.

References

External links
Profile at FEB.es
Profile at ACB.com
Profile at Eurocup Basketball

1986 births
Living people
American expatriate basketball people in Spain
American men's basketball players
Baloncesto Fuenlabrada players
Basketball players from California
CB Gran Canaria players
CB Valladolid players
Ciudad de Vigo Básquet players
Irish expatriate sportspeople in Spain
Irish men's basketball players
Liga ACB players
Oviedo CB players
Palencia Baloncesto players
People from Woodland, California
Power forwards (basketball)
Saint Mary's Gaels men's basketball players
Sportspeople from Greater Sacramento